North San Jose (abbreviated as NSJ) is the northern region of the city of San Jose, California. North San Jose is made up of numerous neighborhoods grouped into three districts: Alviso, Berryessa, and Rincon / Golden Triangle. North San Jose is bordered by the San Francisco Bay and Milpitas to the north, the Diablo Range to the east, Santa Clara and Sunnyvale to the west, and bound in the south by the Bayshore Freeway (US-101), Nimitz Freeway (CA-880), and Mabury Road.

Districts and neighborhoods
Alviso
Berryessa
Rincon / Golden Triangle
Rincon South

References

Neighborhoods in San Jose, California